Bain Boehlke is an American film and theater actor. In addition to his theatrical career, Boehlke is perhaps best known for such films as Fargo and Four Boxes.

Boehlke is also the founder and former artistic director of The Jungle Theatre in Minneapolis, Minnesota.

Filmography

References

External links

Official Web site http://www.BainBoehlke.com

American male film actors
American theatre directors
American male stage actors
Living people
Year of birth missing (living people)